Hollister Peak  is a  volcanic plug located near Morro Bay, California. It is one of the Nine Sisters, and receives its name from the family that lived at its base in 1884. It was of religious importance to the Chumash. Hollister Peak is on private property and has no public access.

References

External links 
 
 

Nine Sisters
Hills of California
Landforms of San Luis Obispo County, California
Religious places of the indigenous peoples of North America
Volcanic plugs of California